Francisco Coloane Coastal and Marine Protected Area is a national reserve of southern Chile's Magallanes and Antártica Chilena Region.

References

National reserves of Chile
Protected areas of Magallanes Region
Strait of Magellan